Duttaphrynus parietalis, commonly known as the Indian toad or ridged toad, is a species of toad found in the Western Ghats of India.

Description

Head with very prominent ridges, namely a canthal, a slight preorbital, a supraorbital, a postorbital, a parietal, and an orbitotympanic; parietal ridges obliquely directed inwards; snout short, blunt; interorbital space broader than the upper eyelid; tympanum distinct, two thirds the diameter of the eye. First finger extending beyond second; toes half webbed, with single subarticular tubercles; two moderate metatarsal tubercles; no tarsal fold. The tarsometatarsal articulation reaches between the eye and the tip of the snout. Upper surfaces covered with irregular warts; parotoids moderately elongate, elliptical, very prominent. Uniform brown above; beneath marbled with brown.   Male with a subgular vocal sac.

References

External links 

parietalis
Frogs of India
Endemic fauna of the Western Ghats
Near threatened animals
Amphibians described in 1882
Taxa named by George Albert Boulenger